Lazaro Manuel Borrell Hernández (born September 20, 1972 in Santa Clara, Cuba) is a Cuban former professional basketball player. He is a 6'8", 220 lb forward.

During the debut of Cuba's Liga Superior de Baloncesto, Borrell played for the now-defunct Lobos de Villa Clara. He played with the NBA's Seattle SuperSonics during the 1999-2000 NBA season.

In his only season in the NBA, he averaged, 3.6 points, 2.4 rebounds, and 0.6 assists per game.

References

External links

1972 births
Living people
Boca Juniors basketball players
Caciques de Humacao players
Cuban men's basketball players
Defecting sportspeople of Cuba
Cuban expatriate basketball people in Argentina
Cuban expatriate basketball people in Puerto Rico
Cuban expatriate basketball people in the United States
National Basketball Association players from Cuba
Obras Sanitarias basketball players
Power forwards (basketball)
Seattle SuperSonics players
Small forwards
Undrafted National Basketball Association players
1994 FIBA World Championship players
People from Santa Clara, Cuba